This article is a catalog of actresses and models who have appeared on the cover of Elle Brasil, the Brazilian edition of Elle magazine.

2010

2011

2012

2013

2014

2015

2016

2017

2018

External links
 Elle Brasil
 Elle Brasil at Models.com

Brasil